Richard LaGravenese (born October 30, 1959)  is an American screenwriter and film director, known for The Fisher King, The Bridges of Madison County, and Behind the Candelabra.

Personal life
LaGravenese was born in Brooklyn, New York, the son of a taxi driver. He is of Italian descent. He graduated from New York University's Tisch School of the Arts in 1980 with a bachelor of fine arts degree in acting.

Career
LaGravenese wrote The Fisher King on spec in the late 1980s. It was acquired by Stacey Sher, Lynda Obst, Debra Hill's production company and subsequently directed by Terry Gilliam.

In New York City during the early 1980s, billed as "The Double R" comedy duo, in collaboration with playwright Richard O'Donnell, LaGravenese co-penned and consecutively performed in several Off-Off-Broadway productions including Spare Parts, Blood-Brothers at The 78th Street Theatre Lab, The Lion Theatre, and West Bank Cafe.

LaGravanese wrote an adaptation for the famously on-and-off version of the musical Gypsy for Barbra Streisand. In 2015, he revealed that he'd spent several months working on the script with Streisand. "I had the best time with her. I can’t even tell you. It was like a fantasy come true. I did my first draft and went to her house to do rewrites. She’s so meticulous in the best possible way. We went through it page by page by page."

Filmography

Film

Television

References

7. ^Jeremy Kinser (February 13, 2015) ‘The Last Five Years’ Director On His Heartbreaking New Musical And Working On ‘Gypsy’ With Barbra Streisand'

External links

HuffingtonPost
DarkHorizons
CharlieRose
MovieMaker

1959 births
Living people
Male actors from New York City
American male screenwriters
Writers from Brooklyn
Tisch School of the Arts alumni
American people of Italian descent
American writers of Italian descent
Film directors from New York City
Lafayette High School (New York City) alumni
Screenwriters from New York (state)